Lemmes Aerodrome,  was a temporary World War I airfield in France.  It was located  West-Northwest of the commune of Lemmes, in the Meuse department in Lorraine in north-eastern France.

Overview
The airfield was one of the major airfields used by the French Air Service about Verdun, from early 1916 to the end of the war, with Vadelaincourt other major airfield touching it.

For probably some operational reason, the American 186th Aero Squadron moved here from nearby Souilly Aerodrome on 7 November 1918, already back there on 24 November, after the Armistice had been signed.

Eventually, the airfield was returned to agricultural use.  Today it is a series of cultivated fields located northwest of Lemmes.  The airfield was located west of the D 1916, which takes its symbolic number from the fact that it was the only road always open during the Battle of Verdun for bringing supplies to the city and the front units.

See also

 List of Air Service American Expeditionary Force aerodromes in France

References

 Series "D", Volume 2, Squadron histories,. Gorrell's History of the American Expeditionary Forces Air Service, 1917–1919, National Archives, Washington, D.C.

External links

World War I sites of the United States
World War I airfields in France